Jingle Ma Cho Shing (born 1957) is a Hong Kong-based writer and director, best known for his action films such as Tokyo Raiders and Seoul Raiders.

Filmography

References

External links

Jingle Ma at LoveHKFilm.com
 HK cinemagic entry
 Information on Mulan

Hong Kong film directors
1957 births
Living people